Jalalabad (also Romanized as Jalālābād; also known as Jalālābād-e Golestān) is a village in Baharestan Rural District, in the Central District of Nain County, Isfahan Province, Iran. At the 2006 census, its population was 16, in 8 families.

References 

Populated places in Nain County